The Aunt's Story is the third published novel by the Australian novelist and 1973 Nobel Prize-winner, Patrick White.  It tells the story of Theodora Goodman, a lonely middle-aged woman who travels to France after the death of her mother, and then to America, where she experiences what is either a gradual mental breakdown or an epiphanic revelation.

Although the novel was shunned by the reading public upon its initial publication in 1948, White himself expressed a personal fondness for it: "It is the one I have most affection for," he wrote in 1959, "and I always find it irritating that only six Australians seem to have liked it."

External links
 Excerpts from the novel at the ABC's "Why Bother With Patrick White?" archive.
 Synopsis and interpretation by Alan Lawson at the ABC's "Why Bother With Patrick White?" archive.

References 

1948 Australian novels
Novels by Patrick White